AVA DoBro, also known as Avalon Willoughby West and by its address of 100 Willoughby, is a residential high-rise building in Downtown Brooklyn, New York City. A large building, it has 826 units over 57 floors. As part of the development, a new entrance to the Jay Street–MetroTech station of the New York City Subway was built, including an elevator. 

Gallery

See also
 List of tallest buildings in Brooklyn
 List of tallest buildings in New York City
 The Hub

References

External links

Residential skyscrapers in New York City
Residential buildings in Brooklyn
Downtown Brooklyn
Skyscrapers in Brooklyn
Residential buildings completed in 2015
2015 establishments in New York City